Joan Bauer may refer to:

Joan Bauer (novelist) (born 1951), American novelist
Joan Bauer (politician), Michigan state representative